Jeong Jung-bu (1106 – 18 October 1179) was a medieval Korean soldier and military dictator during the Goryeo Dynasty (918–1392). He was a career soldier, qualified on military part of civil service examination. He was most noted for leading a coup d'état in 1170 (Revolt of military officers), dethroning the king and beginning of 100-year military reign in Korea.

Early career
Jeong was born in 1106; he learned martial arts and military tactics in his early days. He was often reported to be 7-foot-tall giant with great confidence and intelligence. He was a diligent soldier, and his loyalty earned him the trust from the king. He went through a slow promotion and later became Chief of General Staff.

At the time he became a soldier, the Goryeo Dynasty had a policy that put the civilian power over military. The policy benefited the dynasty well during its early days, and many civilian officials were also able military commanders, such as Gang Gam-chan and Yoon Gwan. However, the civilian rule made many side-effects as time passed on; the military generals was seen as servants, or even slaves of the civilian officials, and treated as slaves by many government officials and advisers to the king. In 998, King Mokjong put military under civilian command, causing the coup d'état of General Gang Jo. In 1014, military officers were not paid because the government had to pay civilian officials first, causing the anger of Generals Choi Jil and Kim Hoon to attempt a failed military rebellion; and later the government even closed the military academy. The grief of army officers became greater and greater as the treatment and view toward them got harsher.

Coup
In 1167, during the royal banquet of King Uijong, Kim Don-jung, son of powerful aristocrat Kim Bu-sik (author of Samguk Sagi), burned Jeong's long beard with a candle, and made fun of him and also mocked the whole military. The incident caused Jeong to have a strong animosity toward aristocrats and civilian officials.

In 1170, King Uijong went to his royal villa to rest and to hold another feast, and he also held a martial arts competition. A young soldier won the event, and was praised by the king. Then, many of king's advisers to the court and eunuchs forced General Yi So-eung, who was at his late fifties, to face the champion, who was about 20. The old general, of course, was not able to fight the young champion and fell down to the ground. Then, a young civilian official named Han Roe, insulted the general and even slapped him across his face in front of the king and many fellow soldiers. General Jeong, who could not stand the advisers' attitude anymore, knocked Han out and insulted him. The incident caused the long grievances of military to explode; young soldiers, notably Colonels Yi Ui-bang, Yi Go and Chae Won, urged Jeong to launch a coup d'état against the entire government and the king, who favored civilian officials over army. Jeong first ignored their opinion but later agreed to revolt against the government. With his order, in the name of commander-in-chief, the whole army rebelled against the king and his advisers. Almost all of advisers, including Kim Don-jung and Han Roe, were killed and King Uijong was overthrown. Jeong then set up a puppet king, King Myeongjong, beginning the 100-year military rule of Korea.

Post coup
However, after the coup d'état in 1170, the leaders of the revolution began to feud with each other. Generals Yi Go and Chae Won were killed by General Yi Ui-bang for treason. Then Yi visited Jeong, who adopted him as a son, only for a while. In 1173, a surviving civilian official Kim Bodang rebelled in northeastern border, trying to restore the civilian order under deposed King Uijong. Yi Ui-bang decided to assassinate Uijong; and after he killed the ex-king, Yi put down the rebellion, which put Yi on the peak of the power. Then Yi began to oppress Buddhism and Confucianism, executed many civilian administrators and scholars, raped royal family members and forced the Crown Prince to marry his daughter. His despotic reign caused the grief of many people, and finally in 1174, a chain of rebellion that lasted for 50 years began in Pyongyang by Jo Wi-chong. Yi Ui-bang sent massive troops to put down the rebellion.

General Jeong, who promoted himself as Prime Minister, decided to put an end to Yi's reign of terror.  He ordered his son, Jeong Gyun, and his son-in-law, General Song Yuin, to kill Yi Ui-bang. Yi was finally murdered by Jeong Gyun, and the power passed to Jeong Jung-bu. Jeong continued to fight against rebels in Pyongyang; however, slaves and people of lowest class of present-day Gongju rebelled against the government. Jeong managed to crush the uprising of Jo, and entered negotiation with outcast rebellion leaders Mangyi and Mangsoyi, but as the official army continued its campaign against the uprising, Mang brothers revolted again. They were executed in 1177, ending the rebellion; but many other impoverished people continued to revolt against the government.

With the law and order crumbling over the whole nation, Jeong decided not to retire from politics even though he was at his late 70's. His son Jeong Gyun, backed by his powerful father, accepted bribes from many officials who tried to gain more power and support from the reigning family; even Jeong's servants and slaves took bribes from politicians and brawled with some of them on the street. Politics drifted toward iniquity, and many people thought another coup d'état was necessary to put an end on Jeong's unjust rule.  In the end, General Gyeong Dae-seung, the youngest general of Goryeo army, revolted against Jeong in October 1179, murdering Jeong Gyun and Song Yuin. Jeong Jung-bu was arrested for corruption and treason, and executed in public few days later.

Popular culture
 Portrayed by Kim Heung-ki in the 2003-2004 KBS TV series Age of Warriors.

See also
List of Goryeo people

12th-century Korean people
Korean generals
1106 births
1179 deaths
Deaths by decapitation
Leaders who took power by coup
Leaders ousted by a coup
Korean murder victims
Regents of Korea